The Battle of Chipyong-ni, also known as the Battle of Dipingli, was a decisive battle of the Korean War that took place from 13 to 15 February 1951 between US and French units of the US 23rd Infantry Regiment and various units of the Chinese People's Volunteer Army (PVA) around the village of Chipyong-ni. The result was a United Nations Command victory. The battle, along with the Third Battle of Wonju, has been called "the Gettysburg of the Korean War", and represents the "high-water mark" of the Chinese invasion of South Korea. Due to the ferocity of the Chinese attack and the heroism of the defenders, the battle has also been called "one of the greatest regimental defense actions in military history".

Background
After Chinese forces entered Korea in November 1950, UN forces, uncertain about the intentions and combat capabilities of the Chinese, drew back behind the 38th parallel and waited to see what the Chinese would do. Plans were even made for complete withdrawal from the peninsula. In this climate of general uncertainty, Lt. General Matthew B. Ridgway decided to make a stand at Chipyong-ni and also at Wonju. He recognized that Chinese forces had overstretched their supply lines and would not be able to keep up their advance much longer. Ridgway intended to use the 23rd RCT to blunt the Chinese attack so that the Eighth Army could carry out a counterattack before the Chinese had a chance to consolidate their forces.

Prelude
Following the Battle of the Twin Tunnels on 1 February 1951, the 23rd Regimental Combat Team under the command of Paul L. Freeman Jr. reached the important crossroads town of Chipyong-ni on 3 February and immediately set up a perimeter defense. Over the next few days, the 23rd RCT dug in and was reinforced by artillery, tank, and engineer elements. By 13 February, their strength consisted of three infantry battalions; the French Infantry Battalion and First Ranger Company, both attached to the regiment; the 37th Field Artillery Battalion; Battery B, 82nd Antiaircraft Artillery Automatic Weapons Battalion; Battery B, 503rd Field Artillery Battalion; Company B, 2nd Engineer Battalion (Combat); elements of the 2nd Signal Co. (attached); and a platoon from the 2nd Medical Battalion. In all, Freeman had 4,500 men under his command, including 2,500 front-line infantrymen.

On 11 February, the Chinese attacked X Corps at Hoengsong as part of their Fourth Phase Offensive, driving back two divisions and leaving the 23rd Regiment at Chipyong-ni behind enemy lines and exposed to a Chinese attack.

The Chinese then sent the entirety of the 39th Army, and divisions of the 40th and 42nd armies to encircle and destroy Chipyong-ni.

On the morning of the 13th, after a patrol revealed a significant Chinese presence on Route 24 to the north of the town, Lt. General Edward Almond, commander of X Corps, ordered the 23rd Regiment to withdraw to the Yoju area,  to the south, due to concerns that it would be encircled by Chinese forces. However, later on the same day, Ridgway reversed this decision after meeting with his superior, Douglas MacArthur. Ridgway insisted on attempting to hold Chipyong-ni, and directed Almond to attack north to relieve the regiment if it was cut off.

Informed of this, Freeman began to bulk up his defenses, and requested resupply by air and airstrikes for 14 February. He deployed his 1st Battalion to the northern part of the perimeter, the 2nd to the south, and the 3rd on the east, with the French on the western side. The 1st Battalion's Company B and the Rangers were kept in reserve behind the 1st Battalion line.

Battle

Day 1
During the afternoon of 13 February, the Chinese forces took up positions around the 23rd's perimeter, though their attempts to advance were stopped by artillery. The U.S. forces observed heavy flare activity throughout the afternoon. Early in the evening, Freeman gathered his unit commanders and told them to expect an attack during the night.

Between 22:00 and 23:00 hours, the Chinese directed small arms and mortar fire at the Americans from the northwest, north, and southeast. C Company, positioned near Route 24 on the northern perimeter, was hit hardest. Slightly after 23:00, Chinese infantrymen moved down hill 397, attacking E and G Companies. They were driven off, but shortly before 24:00 hours, an intense mortar and artillery barrage hit C Company.

After this, the defenders heard bugles, whistles, and bells, followed by a concerted infantry attack all along the perimeter. By midnight, only 3rd Battalion in the east was not engaged. The attack was fierce but brief, intended to probe the US defenses, ending in most places soon after midnight. It was followed by an assault on 1st Battalion at 01:00, but when this was repulsed the Chinese forces dug in beneath the 1st Battalion positions.

At 00:15, a bloody assault was made from the east against K Company. The attack was fought off, but the shooting remained fierce enough that no ambulance could get through to evacuate K Company's wounded. In the north, the French were attacked from hill 345. C Company was forced to withdraw slightly, but counterattacked and regained its positions.

G Company was attacked at 02:30 and 04:00. During the 04:00 attack, it was in danger of being overwhelmed, so a regimental tank was dispatched for support.

At 05:30, the attacks began to let up. There was still fighting in the west and east, however. At first light, the Chinese renewed their attack in the west, against the 3rd Battalion. However, as daylight approached, the Chinese knew they would be vulnerable to Air Force strikes; at 07:30 a Chinese bugler blew a call to withdraw.

Day 2
By dawn on 14 February, Freeman had sustained about 100 casualties and personally been hit in the leg by mortar fire. He retained his command despite the injury. Air support kept the Chinese away during the daylight hours of the 14th, but the Americans were running dangerously low on ammunition.

At dusk, artillery fire began to come down on the perimeter, followed soon after by infantry assaults. The 3rd Battalion was hit hard, and mortar fire rained down on the regimental command post for an hour. At midnight, the main assault began, with a Chinese wave attack striking A Company, then veering over towards C Company and the French.

By 01:30, K Company in the east had been assaulted twice, and everywhere the ammunition shortage was critical. Though Air Force planes airdropped ammunition, many soldiers were shot as they tried to reach it. Throughout the night, C-47 Skytrain transports dropped flares to provide illumination.

At 02:30, I Company's perimeter was penetrated, the first successful penetration of the battle. Units of I Company, however, supported by L Company and the machine-gunners of M Company, counterattacked and restored the perimeter.

Fighting was fiercest, however, in the south, where at around 03:15, Chinese forces broke through the perimeter and forced the defenders out of their positions, a serious threat to the beleaguered regiment. At daybreak on 15 February, Freeman ordered the Ranger company, a platoon from F Company, and 14 men from G Company to counterattack, but they were driven back at 06:15 after sustaining heavy casualties in hand-to-hand fighting. At noon on the 15th, B Company, in full view of the Chinese and across open ground, attacked once more but was pinned down by Chinese machine guns. By 12:30, it was still 9,000 yards from what remained of the earlier counterattack.

In desperation, the regiment sent out four tanks under Captain Perry Sager in an attempt to flank the Chinese.

About this time, at 15:45, units of the 5th Cavalry Regiment (Task Force Crombez) moved out from a town to the south to support the men at Chipyong-ni.

At 14:00, the Chinese retreated from their position inside the perimeter under pressure from an Air Force napalm bombardment and attack by B Company, in which they lost 50% of their men. When B Company took the position at 16:30, its soldiers could see Task Force Crombez in the distance; the task force arrived at 17:25 with nearly 20 tanks. The Chinese withdrew.

The Chinese perspective
Prior to the battle, eight Chinese infantry regiments (around 8,000 men) were deployed in the region: the 343rd and 344th Regiments (both from the 115th Division, 39th Army), 356th and 357th Regiments (both from the 119th Division, 40th Army), 359th Regiment (120th Division, 40th Army), 375th Regiment (125th Division, 42nd Army), and 376th and 377th Regiments (both from the 126th Division, 42nd Army).

According to the memoirs of Xu Guofu, commander of the 119th Division and also field commander of the Chinese forces at Chipyong-ni, five Chinese infantry regiments were deployed to attack the UN troops in this area by Deng Hua, third commander and commissar of the Chinese People Volunteer Army. However, two regiments (the 343rd and 376th) lost their way in the dark and wound up in the wrong place. Due to poor communications, only three regiments (356th, 357th, and 359th) numbering around 3,000 soldiers, were actually committed to the attack on Chipyong-ni.

After a bloody fight overnight, on the morning of 15 February, Xu's troops broke through the perimeter and expected to launch another attack when night fell again. But Xu received an order from Wen Yucheng, commander of the 40th Army, to withdraw as the Chinese discovered that there were over 6,000 UN troops in Chipyong-ni instead of the initial estimate of 1,000 men. In the aftermath of the battle, Xu insisted that the West overestimated Chinese casualties. According to him, the three Chinese regiments committed to the attack suffered a little over 900 casualties, one third of which were killed (Xu does not give figures for non-combat casualties or prisoners).

Aftermath

UN casualties during the battle numbered 51 killed, 250 wounded, and 42 missing. The Chinese lost approximately 2,000 killed and 3,000 wounded.

The battle offered a boost to the morale of Eighth Army, which had until then seen the Chinese as an invincible juggernaut. Soon afterwards, Operation Killer was launched, followed by Operation Ripper. The Chinese, who had hopes of driving the UN forces to the sea, were themselves driven back. Eventually, this led to the start of peace negotiations in July 1951.

General Ridgway spoke at a joint session of the US Congress on 22 May 1952: 

Ridgway continued by saying: 

The headquarters of the Chinese XIX Army Group, in a critique of the battle which was later captured and translated, described the shock of the armored spearhead which battered its way into Chipyong-Ni:

and continued

Now short of supplies, their roadblocks penetrated, and their casualties mounting, the attacking Chinese withdrew to the north.

Awards
On 20 February, Sergeant First Class William S. Sitman, a machine gun section leader in M Company, was posthumously awarded the Medal of Honor for bravery during the battle after he threw himself on a grenade to save five of his comrades.

After the battle, the 23rd RCT and all attached units were awarded the United States Army Distinguished Unit Citation.

See also
23rd Infantry Regiment (United States)
Battle of the Twin Tunnels
French Battalion in the Korean War

Notes

References

External links

Letter from Chip-yong-ni - 13 February 1951 - Return to Heartbreak Ridge
Letter from Chip-yong-ni - 14-15 February 1951 - Return to Heartbreak Ridge
Remembering the Battle at Chipyong-ni - 2nd Infantry Division Story
Defending the Wonju Line, 13-18 February 1951
Leadership in Battle: The Siege at Chipyong-ni - Army
Battle of Chipyon-Ni Feb 1951 Staff Ride Packet - Korean War Educator
The Controversial Task Force Crombez - Army
Heroes of the Korean War - Colonel Paul Freeman - ROKDrop
Korean War History - Wonju and Chipyong-ni
A Surgeon's Story: Treatment of the United Nations Wounded at Chipyong-ni

News
Trapped U.N. Force Rescued After Four Days - The Bend Bulletin, 15 February 1951
Strong Enemy Forces Attempt Flanking Drive - St. Petersburg Times, 16 February 1951
War: Stand at Chipyong - Time, 26 February 1951
Reds Near Wonju and Chipyong In Two-Pronged Drive - The Canberra Times, 15 February 1951
Diggers in Grim Korean Battle - The Age, 17 February 1951
Encircling Reds Smashed by Relief Force - The Canberra Times, 16 February 1951
The Allies: Distinguished Unit - Time, 12 March 1951

Chipyong-ni
Chipyong-ni
Chipyong-ni
Chipyong-ni
History of Gyeonggi Province
February 1951 events in Asia
Battles and operations of the Korean War in 1951